Campbell Crag is a rock peak rising to  at the south end of Testa Ridge on the north slope of Mount Morning, Scott Coast. It was named by the Advisory Committee on Antarctic Names (1994) after Richard J. (Rick) Campbell, fixed-wing Flight Operations Coordinator at McMurdo Station, active in science support in Antarctica from 1981.

References
 

Cliffs of Victoria Land
Scott Coast